The United States Court of Appeals for the Federal Circuit (in case citations, Fed. Cir. or C.A.F.C.) is a United States court of appeals that has special appellate jurisdiction over certain types of specialized cases in the U.S. federal court system. It has exclusive appellate jurisdiction over all U.S. federal cases involving patents, trademarks, government contracts, veterans' benefits, public safety officers' benefits, federal employees' benefits, and various other categories. Unlike other federal courts, the Federal Circuit has no jurisdiction over cases involving criminal, bankruptcy, immigration, or U.S. state law.

Headquartered in Washington, D.C., the Federal Circuit was created in 1982 with passage of the Federal Courts Improvement Act, which merged the United States Court of Customs and Patent Appeals and the appellate division of the United States Court of Claims, making the judges of the former courts into circuit judges.  The court occupies the Howard T. Markey National Courts Building as well as the adjacent Benjamin Ogle Tayloe House, former Cosmos Club building, and the Cutts-Madison House in Washington, D.C., on Lafayette Square. The court sits from time to time in locations other than Washington, and its judges can and do sit by designation on the benches of other courts of appeals and federal district courts. , Washington and Lee University School of Law's Millhiser Moot Courtroom had been designated as the continuity of operations site for the court.

Jurisdiction
 
The Federal Circuit is unique among the courts of appeals as it is the only court that has its jurisdiction based wholly upon subject matter rather than geographic location. The court hears certain appeals from all of the United States District Courts, appeals from certain administrative agencies, and appeals arising under certain statutes. Among other things, the Federal Circuit has exclusive jurisdiction over appeals from:
 Article I tribunals:
 United States Court of Federal Claims
 United States Court of Appeals for Veterans Claims
 United States Trademark Trial and Appeal Board
 United States Patent Trial and Appeal Board (formerly known as the United States Board of Patent Appeals and Interferences)
 Boards of contract appeals (for Government contract disputes pursuant to the Contract Disputes Act of 1978):
 Armed Services Board of Contract Appeals
 Civilian Board of Contract Appeals
 Postal Service Board of Contract Appeals
 United States Merit Systems Protection Board (federal employment and employment benefits)
 United States International Trade Commission
 Article III tribunals:
 United States Court of International Trade
 United States district courts relating to:
Patents, including appeals arising from an action against the Commissioner of Patents and Trademarks under 
The Little Tucker Act, 
Section 211 of the Economic Stabilization Act of 1970;
Section 5 of the Emergency Petroleum Allocation Act of 1973;
Section 523 of the Energy Policy and Conservation Act of 1975; and
Section 506(c) of the Natural Gas Policy Act of 1978
 Congressional Office of Compliance

Although the Federal Circuit typically hears all appeals from any United States District Court where the original action included a complaint arising under the patent laws, the Supreme Court decided in Holmes Group, Inc. v. Vornado Air Circulation Systems, Inc. (2002) that the Federal Circuit does not have jurisdiction if the patent claims arose solely as counterclaims by the defendant. However, Congress changed the law in the America Invents Act of 2011, requiring the Federal Circuit to hear all appeals where the original action included a complaint or compulsory counterclaim arising under the patent laws. Thus, the Supreme Court's 2002 Holmes ruling no longer has the force of law.

The decisions of the Federal Circuit, particularly in regard to patent cases, are unique in that they are binding precedent throughout the U.S. within the bounds of the court's subject-matter jurisdiction. This is unlike the other courts of appeals as the authority of their decisions is restricted by geographic location and thus there may be differing judicial standards depending on location. Decisions of the Federal Circuit are only superseded by decisions of the Supreme Court or by applicable changes in the law. Also, review by the Supreme Court is discretionary, so Federal Circuit decisions are often the final word, especially since there are usually no circuit splits given the Federal Circuit's exclusive subject-matter jurisdiction. In its first decision, the Federal Circuit incorporated as binding precedent the decisions of its predecessor courts, the United States Court of Customs and Patent Appeals and the appellate division of the United States Court of Claims.

Because the Court is one of national jurisdiction, panels from the court may sit anywhere in the country.  Typically, once or twice a year, the court will hold oral arguments in a city outside of its native Washington D.C.  The panels may sit in Federal courthouses, state courthouses, or even at law schools.

Composition

Judges on senior status are not subject to this restriction. As with other federal judges, they are nominated by the President and must be confirmed by the Senate. Their terms last during the "good behavior" of the judges, which typically results in life tenure. When eligible, judges may elect to take senior status. This allows a senior judge to continue to serve on the court while handling fewer cases than an active service judge. Each judge in active service employs a judicial assistant and up to four law clerks, while each judge in senior status employs a judicial assistant and one law clerk.

Current composition of the court
:

List of former judges

Chief judges

Notwithstanding the foregoing, when the court was initially created, Congress had to resolve which chief judge of the predecessor courts would become the first chief judge. It was decided that the chief judge of the predecessor court who had the most seniority, as chief judge, would be the new chief judge. This made Howard T. Markey, former chief judge of the Court of Customs and Patent Appeals, the first chief judge.

Succession of seats
The court has twelve seats for active judges, numbered in alphabetical order by their occupant at the time the court was formed, with the sole vacant seat being numbered last. Judges who retire into senior status remain on the bench but leave their seat vacant. That seat is filled by the next circuit judge appointed by the President.

See also
 Federal Circuit Bar Association
 Federal Circuit appointment history
 List of current United States Circuit Judges
 List of United States patent law cases
 United States Court of Federal Claims

Citations

General references
 
 Source for the duty stations for senior judges
 
 Source for the state, lifetime, term of active judgeship, term of chief judgeship, term of senior judgeship, appointer, termination reason, and seat information

Further reading

External links

 United States Court of Appeals for the Federal Circuit
 Recent opinions from Findlaw
 The Federal Circuit Bar Association
 The Federal Circuit Historical Society
 The Federal Circuit Bar Journal

 
1982 establishments in the United States
Courts and tribunals established in 1982